The Willow Tree (translit. Bid-e Majnoon) is an 2005 Iranian film directed by Majid Majidi. It tells the story of Youssef, a man blinded in a fireworks accident, when eight years old. After an operation he regains his vision, changing his life in unexpected ways. It was filmed from 10 February 2004 – 10 August 2004 in both Tehran and Paris.

It was released in the United States on August 3, 2007.

Cast

Parviz Parastui - Youssef
Roya Taymourian - Roya
Afarin Obeisi - Mother
Mohammad Amir Naji - Morteza
Melika Eslafi - Mariam
Leila Otadi - Pari
Mahmoud Behraznia - Mahmood
Ebrahim Otadi - Mehdi

References

External links 
 
 
 

2005 drama films
2005 films
Films directed by Majid Majidi
2000s Persian-language films
Films whose director won the Best Directing Crystal Simorgh
Iranian drama films
Films shot in Paris
Films shot in Tehran
Crystal Simorgh for Audience Choice of Best Film winners